Bedell Settlement, often shortened to Bedell, is a settlement in Carleton County, New Brunswick.

Education

Bedell has one school, Meduxnekeag Consolidlated School (MCS) that serves grades K-8.

History

Located 4.28 km ESE of Richmond Corner: Woodstock Parish, Carleton County: founded by Joseph Bedell, son of the Loyalist settler John Bedell (1755-1838): in 1866 Bedell Settlement was a farming community with approximately 7 resident families, including the families of Edwin Bedell and Walter Bedell: PO 1904–1913.

Notable people

Gage Montgomery - PC Party of Canada

See also
List of communities in New Brunswick

References

Communities in Carleton County, New Brunswick